Loodna Parish was a rural municipality of Estonia, in Rapla County. The parish was existed until 1890. The parish was re-established in 1990. In 2002 the parish was liquidated.

References

Rapla County
Former municipalities of Estonia